Lord Clare may refer to:

any of the individuals who have held the title Earl of Clare or Viscount Clare
Robert Nugent, 1st Earl Nugent (1702–1788), who was created Viscount Clare in 1767, and thus styled "Lord Clare" until 1776